Francisco Yunis (born 12 August 1964) is a former professional tennis player from Argentina.

Career
Partnering his brother Juan Carlos, Yunis was a losing doubles finalist at Bordeaux in 1983. En route they defeated the top seeded pairing of Pablo Arraya and Victor Pecci, Sr.

The Argentine appeared at two Grand Slam tournaments in 1987. In the French Open he had straight set wins over Gilad Bloom and Loïc Courteau, to make the third round, where he lost to 11th seed Kent Carlsson. He lost to Jim Pugh in the opening round of the US Open. Also that year, Yunis was a semi-finalist in Athens.

Yunis beat qualifier Eduardo Osta in the opening round of the 1988 French Open, but was then eliminated from the tournament by eventual champion Mats Wilander.

He made the semifinals at Geneva in 1989 and was a quarterfinalist at Florence in 1992.

Grand Prix career finals

Doubles: 1 (0–1)

References

1964 births
Living people
Argentine male tennis players
Tennis players from Buenos Aires
20th-century Argentine people